California's 44th district may refer to:

 California's 44th congressional district
 California's 44th State Assembly district